The Gift is a Turkish drama fantasy Netflix series starring Beren Saat. It was written by Jason George and Nuran Evren Şit. The first season consists of 8 episodes and became available for streaming on Netflix on December 27, 2019. The series is an adaptation of the novel Dünyanın Uyanışı (The World's Awakening) by Şengül Boybaş. The second season was released on September 10, 2020. The series was renewed for a third and final season, which premiered on June 17, 2021.

Plot
Atiye is a young woman who has been drawing a fertility symbol since her childhood, without knowing the meaning attached to it. She is a part-time teacher as well as an abstract painter. She has always drawn that symbol, but never saw it anywhere other than in her own art. She is in a relationship with a man named Ozan, the son of a very wealthy businessman named Serdar, although Atiye does not find peace in her relationship. She hosts her first exhibition which showcases the same symbol she has been drawing since her childhood in different colours and sizes. All her paintings are loved by people and hence her exhibition is a success. On the same day, an archeologist named Erhan discovers something strange in Göbekli Tepe: an unusual artifact which has laid buried for millennia. Atiye recognises that it is the same symbol that she has been attached to since childhood. She makes an immediate decision to go see the symbol the next day herself. On her way there, she sees a girl with a star mark on her forehead with some cattle on the road. She asks the child for directions but she can not understand her language.

Upon hearing Göbekli Tepe, the girl understands and leads her to the site. There she meets Erhan and tells him about her association with the symbol, but he thinks either she is making up the story to get fame or has lost her mind altogether. She asks him to let her see it but he refuses, saying that it is not open for public. After her failed attempt to see the symbol, she checks in to a hotel. The girl with the star mark comes knocking on her hotel room door. She leads her to the cave and she sees purple stones; that is when Erhan and one of his crew men pull her out of the site and ask her to leave. Atiye tells Erhan that a little girl with a star mark is still inside and that there are purple stones. He does not believe her and again asks her to leave. 

On the next day Erhan and his crew go further inside and sees the purple stones and a drawing of a girl with a star mark on her forehead. Erhan later contacts Atiye. Upon her return, Ozan proposes to her and she accepts. Atiye frequently sees an old woman approaching her and that scares Atiye a lot. Erhan and Atiye's fates are connected by some mysterious duty that they have towards the world, and it is up to them to find out what their purpose is meant to be... They try to find out what this is all about. That's when Erhan's father's old colleague gives him the diary and some documents that belonged to his father since he recalled the symbol Erhan discovered from his father's notes. Erhan's father left many messages for Atiye and Erhan many years ago, before the birth of Atiye, and the messages too have to be found and solved like riddles. Ozan's father Serdar Yılmaz and Erhan's ex girlfriend Hannah work for some mysterious mafia that needs Atiye.

Season 3

Atiye and Erhan continue to search for their daughter. Seeking to reach her daughter Aden, Atiye faces a wrenching dilemma as dark forces attempt to harness Aden's cosmic powers to bring about destruction.

Season 3 is largely set in Dara and references an undefined modern-era massacre that has been purged from all official documents. The real-life Dara was the site of a massacre during the Armenian genocide.

Cast

Episodes

Season 1 (2019)

Season 2 (2020)

Production 
Filming took place in Istanbul, Göbekli Tepe, Adıyaman, Mount Nemrut, Cappadocia, Mardin, and Bursa, among other locations in Turkey.

Reception 
Pop culture site Decider.com's review column Stream It Or Skip It recommended The Gift as "stream it", calling the show "a good-looking series about a human’s connection to the mystical" and "ground[ed] in reality, [not] hokey or overly precious."

References

External links
 
 

Turkish-language Netflix original programming
2019 Turkish television series debuts
Television shows based on novels
Television shows set in Istanbul
Television series produced in Istanbul